Ruée sur l'Oklahoma is a Lucky Luke comic written by Morris. It is the fourteenth album in the Lucky Luke series. The comic was printed by Dupuis in 1960 and by Cinebook in 2009 as The Oklahoma Land Rush. The story is based on the historical Land Run of 1889.

Synopsis 
By 1830, the American government had given Oklahoma to the Indians where they were bored. Several years later, they bought the land back for some glass beads to promote colonization. It was decided that on April 22, 1889, the territory would be open to colonization and, to be sure that there will be no one installed before the rush, Lucky Luke is responsible for monitoring the operation. The adventure begins by emptying the territory of the inhabitants who had ventured there without legal authorization, then watching the candidates with the rush with the border. Some, including Beastly Blubber, do not hesitate to try to cross the border but they are easily detected by Lucky Luke. Coyote Will, who has a simple-minded accomplice called Dopey, is also trying to cross the border, but he is quickly overtaken by Luke.

The day before the rush, everyone seems ready. Some have doped their horse to leave faster, others have sabotaged the carriage of a possible competitor.

The next day at noon, the signal is given and it's the rush. The settlers enter Oklahoma and take over the land in a rather anarchic way. A city is created, Boomville, where houses are built at full speed. The speculation is going well and some do business in gold. It is in this context that Coyote Will, Beastly Blubber and Dopey arrive. After taking over the saloon, they sell alcohol despite the ban and form a secret gambling den. Lucky Luke stops them.

Then elections for the town hall are organized and three quarters of the population are candidates. The three bandits are released to vote and Dopey decides to also campaign. To the surprise of all and first of all his accomplices, he is elected mayor. And, to the great satisfaction of all and thanks to the help of Lucky Luke, he makes a good mayor. But misery sets in because of drought. Coyote Will organizes a demonstration against the mayor but a sandstorm ruins everything. People leave Oklahoma; it's the end of Boomville. Dopey chases his two former accomplices, declaring that he now leads an honest life. Finally, Oklahoma is returned to the Indians for the same glass beads they had accepted at the beginning.

Characters 

 Coyote Will: Tries to enter Oklahoma illegally. Subsequently, he tries various dishonest schemes in Boomville with the help of Beastly Blubber and Dopey.
 Beastly Blubber: Tries to enter Oklahoma illegally. Subsequently, he becomes the accomplice of Coyote Will and joins all his dishonest business.
 Dopey: Coyote Will's accomplice. Simple of mind, he believes everything that his leader tells him. He eventually becomes mayor of Boomville thanks to certain circumstances and finally becomes honest. Morris caricatured Michel Simon for the character.

References

 Morris publications in Spirou BDoubliées

External links
 Lucky Luke official site album index 
Goscinny website on Lucky Luke

Comics by Morris (cartoonist)
Comics set in Oklahoma
Lucky Luke albums
1960 graphic novels
Works by René Goscinny
Fiction set in 1889